Norway competed at the 2011 World Aquatics Championships in Shanghai, China between July 16 and 31, 2011.

Medalists

Diving

Norway has qualified 3 athletes in diving.

Men

Swimming

Norway qualified 4 swimmers.

Men

Women

References

Nations at the 2011 World Aquatics Championships
2011 in Norwegian sport
Norway at the World Aquatics Championships